Colwellia asteriadis is a Gram-negative and rod-shaped bacterium from the genus of Colwellia which has been isolated from the starfish Asterias amurensis from the Sea of Japan.

References

External links
Type strain of Colwellia asteriadis at BacDive -  the Bacterial Diversity Metadatabase

Alteromonadales
Bacteria described in 2010